WFMH-FM (95.5 FM, "Big 95.5") is a radio station licensed to serve Hackleburg, Alabama, United States.  The station is owned by TNT, Inc. It airs a country music format and features programming from The Paul Finebaum Radio Network.

History
The WFMH-FM call letters were originally used by 101.1 FM in Cullman, Alabama when it first went on the air in March 1950. This station is now WXJC-FM 101.1, the call letters having been changed by former owner Eddins Broadcasting Co.

The call letters WFMH-FM were assigned to the current 95.5 FM in 1998.  This station was granted its original construction permit by the Federal Communications Commission on December 12, 1993.  The new station was assigned call letters WCOC on May 20, 1994. The call letters were changed to WXXR-FM on August 9, 1996. After one extension, WXXR-FM received its license to cover from the FCC on September 3, 1996.  The station was assigned the current WFMH-FM call letters by the FCC on November 22, 1998.

In May 2004, Voice of Cullman LLC (Clark P. Jones, member/manager) agreed to transfer the license for WFMH-FM and then-sister station WFMH (AM) to Williams Communications (Walton E. Williams Jr., president/director). The two stations sold for a reported total of $2.45 million.

In August 2004, the station received authorization to change its city of license from Holly Pond, Alabama, to Hackleburg, Alabama. At the time of the move, the station was a longtime affiliate of ABC Radio Networks "Real Country" Satellite format.  The move began in June 2005, completed the move in August 2005, and the station received its latest license to cover in November 2005.

The future
On December 21, 2009, WFMH-FM was sold to TNT, Inc. for a reported sale of $150,000.

References

External links

FMH-FM
Country radio stations in the United States
Marion County, Alabama
Radio stations established in 1994
1994 establishments in Alabama